Selina Priest (formerly Goodman; born 21 August 1990) is an Australian rules footballer who played for the Brisbane Lions in the AFL Women's (AFLW).

Early life
Priest was born in 1996 on the Gold Coast, Queensland. She was playing for Coolangatta Tweed Heads when she was drafted.

AFLW career
Priest, when known as Selina Goodman, was recruited by Brisbane with the number 98 pick in the 2016 AFL Women's draft. She made her debut in the Lions' inaugural game against Melbourne at Casey Fields on 5 February 2017.

She was delisted by Brisbane at the end of the 2017 season, before changing her surname to Priest and being redrafted by the club ahead of the 2020 season. Following the 2021 season, Priest was delisted by Brisbane again, without having played a game in her second stint on the list.

References

External links
 

1990 births
Living people
Sportspeople from the Gold Coast, Queensland
Sportswomen from Queensland
Australian rules footballers from Queensland
Brisbane Lions (AFLW) players